The 2000 Amílcar Cabral Cup was held in Estádio da Várzea, the national stadium of Cape Verde. The tournament was originally scheduled November 27—December 5, 1999, but as heavy rain delayed renovations to the national stadium, it was postponed to May 2000.

Group stage

Group A

Sierra Leone arrived late; the match was not played, instead, it was rewarded 3–0 to Senegal.

Group B

Knockout stage

Semi-finals

Third place match

Final

References
Details in RSSSF archives

Amílcar Cabral Cup